WAEB-FM (104.1 MHz, "B104") is a Top 40 (CHR) radio station licensed to Allentown, Pennsylvania. The station is owned by iHeartMedia, Inc. and broadcasts a contemporary hit radio format.

History
WAEB-FM signed on in 1961, initially simulcasting the Top 40 format airing on WAEB (790 AM). In the late 1960s, WAEB-FM separated from WAEB and went through several formats before eventually becoming a country music station with the WXKW call sign.

In April 1985, the station reverted to the WAEB-FM call sign and switched to a soft adult contemporary format, playing a small number of adult standards artists initially as well as a few new songs. The station was known as "Light 104 WAEB-FM", and it was a "niche" format meant to compete with WFMZ (100.7 FM) (which was easy listening at the time) and WLEV (96.1 FM) (which was an automated/live assist "Hot AC").

By the early part of 1986, WAEB FM had evolved to more of a mainstream AC format, but by the late part of 1986, the station was phasing out the "Light" name and became "104 WAEB-FM", and the music mix changed to a more heavily dayparted AC/CHR mix without the hype.

On January 26, 1987, the day known as when "the records went away", the station switched to a CHR format and became "The world's first ever laser hit-music radio station, The New Laser 104.1 WAEB-FM". This was aptly named because 90% percent of the music (when available) was played on CD. One remnant of the station's "Laser Days" was at Dorney Park & Wildwater Kingdom, where in 1987, their "Colossus" steel roller coaster was renamed "The Laser" until it was moved in 2008. Legendary voice man Mitch Craig was the voice of WAEB-FM in its "Laser" years.

In 1991, the station gradually replaced the "Laser 104.1" branding with "104.1 WAEB-FM". In September of that year, after WHXT ("Hot 99.9") in Easton switched to WODE-FM and rebranded as "Oldies 99.9", WAEB-FM's transition to "BDay" was complete. The station then became known as "The New B104 FM".

The station positioned itself as "The New B104 FM" through late 1992. Brian James became the new voice of WAEB-FM after Mitch Craig. By late 1992, the station started to play down the fact that they were "new" and began positioning itself as the station that plays "10 songs in a row" and gives you "Everything You Need to Know" because of its emphasis on local news in the morning and afternoon, as well as traffic reports every 10 minutes. Ken Matthews hosted the morning show and Chuck McGee did the afternoon drive.  Rich Davis (now at KDWB in the Twin Cities) joined in 1992 and did overnights before eventually moving to nights using the name "Joe Friday".

By Spring 1996, B104 was reimaged; most of the flame-throwing CHR jingles from the '80s were dropped and Sean Caldwell became the new voice of WAEB-FM after Brian James. The Retro 80's Buffet began at noon, hosted originally by Jennifer Knight (now on WAYV in Atlantic City). In late 1996, B-104 began broadcasting Open House Party with John Garabedian on Saturday nights after it was dropped by Pottsville's WAVT-FM (T-102). By 1997, B104 began playing a lot more "softer" songs during the day that a lot of other CHR's didn't play (like "Here in My Heart" by Chicago), to pick up listeners who felt displaced by the signing off of WLEV in July 1997. In late 1998, B104 began using a new jingle package and streaming on the web.

In the 1990s, B104 served as Allentown's de facto Adult Contemporary station as it eliminated rap and hard rock during the day. B104 aired special edits of songs such as Green Day's Holiday, Beyonce's Crazy In Love, and many others where the raps or spoken parts were extracted from the songs. Through the 2000s, B104 had a "whatever weekend" to distance themselves from the repetition cliches of pop radio.

In 2006, B104 was re-imaged again, dropping Sean Caldwell as the voice as well as the "10 in a row" slogan. Morning man Ken Matthews exited, and long-time night guy Mike Kelly was moved to mornings, as the station then began to resemble other CHR stations owned by Clear Channel Communications (now iHeartMedia) in markets around the country, a sound they still maintain today as a Mainstream CHR radio station. Today, B104 is a Mainstream CHR that no longer "dayparts" their music. B104 relies heavily on syndicated products from their parent company iHeartMedia, along with a live and local morning show "Mike and Steph in The Morning".

B104 featured the "Firecracker 500" every  weekend through 2003 with the #1 song usually being the biggest hit on the station in the last year.

B104 is a part of the iHeartRadio network. On October 20, 2012, B104 dropped Open House Party on Saturday nights and replaced it with Clear Channel's Saturday Night Online with Romeo (now Most Requested Live).

B104 is continually at the top of the 12+ ratings in the Lehigh Valley maintaining 10+ shares for almost the last 25 years.

WAEB-FM-HD2 has had several different formats. Previously, it has aired new Top 40 music, Alternative, a simulcast of WAEB, and currently, country.

Signal note

Translators

W221CU-Allentown and W296CL-Reading (Latina FM) has been airing a Spanish CHR format since May 2017.

See also
Media in the Lehigh Valley

References

External links
 

AEB-FM
Contemporary hit radio stations in the United States
Radio stations established in 1961
1961 establishments in Pennsylvania
IHeartMedia radio stations